Statistics of League of Ireland in the 1982-83 season.

Overview
It was contested by 14 teams, and Athlone Town won the championship.

Final classification

Results

Top scorers

References
League Table

Ireland, 1982-83
1982–83 in Republic of Ireland association football
League of Ireland seasons